The 2009 Calgary Stampeders season was the 52nd season for the team in the Canadian Football League and their 71st overall. The Stampeders attempted to repeat as Grey Cup champions.

The Stampeders finished in second place with a 10–7–1 record. They appeared in the West Final but lost to the Saskatchewan Roughriders.

Offseason

CFL draft 
The 2009 CFL Draft took place on May 2, 2009. The Stampeders selected safety Eric Fraser of Central Michigan University in the first round, eighth overall.

Preseason

Regular season

Season standings

Season schedule

Roster

Player stats

Passing

Rushing

Receiving

Awards and records

2009 CFL All-Stars
OT – Ben Archibald
CB – Brandon Browner
WR – Jeremaine Copeland
RB – Joffrey Reynolds

Playoffs

Schedule

Bracket

*=Team won in Overtime.

West Semi-Final 
Date and time: Sunday, November 15, 2:30 PM Mountain Standard TimeVenue: McMahon Stadium, Calgary, Alberta

West Final 
Date and time: Sunday, November 22, 2:30 PM Mountain Standard TimeVenue: Mosaic Stadium, Regina, Saskatchewan

References

Calgary Stampeders Season, 2009
Calgary Stampeders seasons
2009 in Alberta